Gamma Zeta Alpha Fraternity, Inc. was founded on December 3, 1987 at California State University, Chico in Chico, California. It is a Latino Interest fraternity that emphasizes Latino culture and the success of Latino males in higher education. Although Gamma Zeta Alpha Fraternity, Inc. is Latino by tradition, membership in the fraternity is open to all college males and includes members from various ethnicities including Black, Asian, Middle Eastern, White, European, and others. Following its founding principles, the fraternity encourages and creates programs that assist disadvantaged and low-income communities. Its goals are to promote scholarship for Latinos in higher education while instilling a sense of pride in Latino heritage.

History 
In 1987, fifteen men came together to found what would later become Gamma Zeta Alpha Fraternity, Inc.

Expansion 
Since its founding, Gamma Zeta Alpha Fraternity, Inc. has expanded to include chapters at schools throughout California, and most recently in Arizona. It is the only NALFO fraternity that has never had an inactive chapter due to lack of membership.  Gamma Zeta Alpha Fraternity, Inc. strives to ensure the potential for growth for all of its chapters once they are established. By teaching prospective members organizational knowledge and valuable skill sets to run a successful chapter, Gamma Zeta Alpha Fraternity, Inc. sets a foundation that promotes the success of its chapters within the university and surrounding communities.

NALFO 
Established in 1998, the National Association of Latino Fraternal Organizations (NALFO) is an umbrella council for 21 Latino Greek letter organizations across the United States. The purpose of NALFO is to promote and foster positive interfraternal relations, communication, and development of all Latino fraternal organizations through mutual respect, leadership, honesty, professionalism and education.

Member requirements 
To begin the membership education process of Gamma Zeta Alpha Fraternity, Inc, every prospective member must fulfill the following requirements:
be a full-time undergraduate or graduate student at a four-year college or university.
have a minimum 2.5 cumulative grade point average.

Chapters 
Chapters of Gamma Zeta Alpha include:

See also 
 List of social fraternities and sororities
 National Association of Latino Fraternal Organizations

References 

Student organizations established in 1987
1987 establishments in California
Hispanic and Latino American culture in California
National Association of Latino Fraternal Organizations
Student societies in the United States
Hispanic and Latino American organizations
California State University, Chico